Liolaemus azarai is a species of lizard in the family  Liolaemidae. It is native to Argentina and Paraguay.

References

azarai
Reptiles described in 2003
Reptiles of Argentina
Reptiles of Paraguay
Taxa named by Luciano Javier Ávila